Yoel Margalith (February 1933 – 2011) was an Israeli researcher. He was a professor at the Ben-Gurion University of the Negev.

Biography
Yoel Margalith was born in February 1933 in Čantavir, Yugoslavia. In 1948, he emigrated to Israel with his family. Margalith attended the Hebrew University of Jerusalem.

Margalith discovered Bacillus thuringiensis israelensis and was given the name, Mr. Mosquito, due this discovery.

Awards
 2003: Tyler Prize for Environmental Achievement

References

1933 births
2011 deaths
Hebrew University of Jerusalem alumni